Kul Papa (also Romanized as  Kūl Pāpā; also known as Kūl Bābā) is a village in Jastun Shah Rural District, Hati District, Lali County, Khuzestan Province, Iran. At the 2006 census, its population was 119, in 24 families.

References 

Populated places in Lali County